Telphusa xyloptera is a moth of the family Gelechiidae first described by Edward Meyrick in 1932. It is found in Uganda.

References

Moths described in 1932
Telphusa
Taxa named by Edward Meyrick